Johnny Test is a Canadian animated series created by Scott Fellows, developed by WildBrain, and a revival to the 2005 series of the same name. The series premiered on July 16, 2021, on Netflix, and also premiered on Family Chrgd on October 16, 2021. An interactive special, titled Johnny Test's Ultimate Meatloaf Quest, premiered on November 16. The second season was released on January 7, 2022.

Voice cast 

 James Arnold Taylor as Johnny Test, Hank Anchorman, Mr. Mittens, Dark Vegan
 Trevor Devall as Dukey, Mr. Henry Teacherman
 Emily Tennant as Mary Test
 Maryke Hendrikse as Susan Test
 Ian James Corlett as Hugh Test
 Kathleen Barr as Lila Test
 Bill Mondy as Mr. Black, Brain Freezer
 Deven Mack as Mr. White
 Lee Tockar as The General, Bling Bling Boy, Albert, Speed McCool
 Andrew Francis as Gil
 Scott McNeil as King Zizrar

Production and development 
On June 11, 2013, Teletoon announced the original series renewal for season 7 consisting of 13 episodes and a three-part special. However, in response to a tweet on June 25, 2015, voice actor James Arnold Taylor stated that he wasn't aware of any plans for more seasons.

In January 2020, WildBrain announced that their Vancouver studio was hiring for a new Johnny Test project separate from a planned series of new Johnny Test web shorts (the first of which was released on May 2, 2020, but later made private). On May 6, 2020, WildBrain confirmed the series had been picked up by Netflix for two more seasons and a 66-minute interactive special set for release in 2021, with Fellows returning as showrunner and executive producer. In June 2021, it was announced that most of the main cast would reprise their respective roles.

Episodes

Season 1 (2021)

Special (2021)

Season 2 (2022)

References

External links 
 Johnny Test (2021) at Netflix

 
2020s Canadian animated television series
2021 Canadian television series debuts
2022 Canadian television series endings
American sequel television series
Animated television series about children
Canadian children's animated action television series
Canadian children's animated adventure television series
Canadian children's animated comic science fiction television series
Canadian children's animated science fantasy television series
Canadian television series revived after cancellation
English-language Netflix original programming
Netflix children's programming
Animated television series by Netflix
Television series by DHX Media
Television series created by Scott Fellows
Television shows filmed in Vancouver